There are ninety mammal species in Romania, of which one is critically endangered, one is endangered, fourteen are vulnerable, and four are near threatened.

The following tags are used to highlight each species' conservation status as assessed by the International Union for Conservation of Nature:

Order: Rodentia (rodents)

Rodents make up the largest order of mammals, with over 40% of mammalian species. They have two incisors in the upper and lower jaw which grow continually and must be kept short by gnawing.

Suborder: Sciurognathi
Family: Sciuridae (squirrels)
Subfamily: Sciurinae
Tribe: Sciurini
Genus: Sciurus
 Red squirrel, S. vulgaris 
Subfamily: Xerinae
Tribe: Marmotini
Genus: Marmota
 Alpine marmot, M. marmota  reintroduced
Genus: Spermophilus
 European ground squirrel, Spermophilus citellus VU
 Speckled ground squirrel, Spermophilus suslicus VU
Family: Gliridae (dormice)
Subfamily: Leithiinae
Genus: Dryomys
 Forest dormouse, D. nitedula
Genus: Eliomys
 Garden dormouse, E. quercinus 
Genus: Muscardinus
 Hazel dormouse, Muscardinus avellanarius NT
Subfamily: Glirinae
Genus: Glis
 European edible dormouse, Glis glis NT
Family: Dipodidae (jerboas)
Subfamily: Sicistinae
Genus: Sicista
 Northern birch mouse, Sicista betulina NT
 Southern birch mouse, Sicista subtilis NT
Family: Spalacidae
Subfamily: Spalacinae
Genus: Spalax
 Bukovin mole rat, Spalax graecus VU
Genus: Nannospalax
 Lesser mole rat, Nannospalax leucodon VU
Family: Cricetidae
Subfamily: Cricetinae
Genus: Cricetulus
 Grey dwarf hamster, Cricetulus migratorius NT
Genus: Cricetus
 European hamster, Cricetus cricetus LC
Genus: Mesocricetus
 Romanian hamster, Mesocricetus newtoni VU
Subfamily: Arvicolinae
Genus: Arvicola
 European water vole, A. amphibius 
Genus: Chionomys
 Snow vole, Chionomys nivalis
Genus: Clethrionomys
 Bank vole, Clethrionomys glareolus
Genus: Microtus
 Field vole, Microtus agrestis
 Common vole, Microtus arvalis
 Southern vole, Microtus rossiaemeridionalis
 European pine vole, Microtus subterraneus
 Tatra vole, Microtus tatricus
Family: Muridae (mice, rats, voles, gerbils, hamsters)
Subfamily: Murinae
Genus: Apodemus
 Striped field mouse, Apodemus agrarius
 Yellow-necked mouse, Apodemus flavicollis
 Wood mouse, Apodemus sylvaticus LC
 Ural field mouse, Apodemus uralensis
Genus: Micromys
 Eurasian harvest mouse, Micromys minutus NT
Genus: Mus
 Steppe mouse, Mus spicilegus NT

Order: Lagomorpha (lagomorphs)

The lagomorphs comprise two families, Leporidae (hares and rabbits), and Ochotonidae (pikas). Though they can resemble rodents, and were classified as a superfamily in that order until the early twentieth century, they have since been considered a separate order. They differ from rodents in a number of physical characteristics, such as having four incisors in the upper jaw rather than two.

Family: Leporidae (rabbits, hares)
Genus: Lepus
European hare, L. europaeus 
Genus: Oryctolagus
European rabbit, O. cuniculus  introduced

Order: Erinaceomorpha (hedgehogs and gymnures)

The order Erinaceomorpha contains a single family, Erinaceidae, which comprise the hedgehogs and gymnures. The hedgehogs are easily recognised by their spines while gymnures look more like large rats.

Family: Erinaceidae (hedgehogs)
Subfamily: Erinaceinae
Genus: Erinaceus
Northern white-breasted hedgehog, E. roumanicus

Order: Soricomorpha (shrews, moles, and solenodons)

Shrews are insectivorous mammals. They closely resemble mice while the moles are stout-bodied burrowers.

Family: Soricidae (shrews)
Subfamily: Crocidurinae
Genus: Crocidura
 Bicolored shrew, C. leucodon 
 Greater white-toothed shrew, C. russula 
 Lesser white-toothed shrew, C. suaveolens 
Subfamily: Soricinae
Tribe: Nectogalini
Genus: Neomys
 Southern water shrew, N. anomalus LC
 Eurasian water shrew, N. fodiens LC
Tribe: Soricini
Genus: Sorex
 Alpine shrew, S. alpinus LC
 Common shrew, S. araneus LC
 Eurasian pygmy shrew, S. minutus LC
Family: Talpidae (moles)
Subfamily: Talpinae
Tribe: Talpini
Genus: Talpa
 European mole, T. europaea LC

Order: Chiroptera (bats)

The bats' most distinguishing feature is that their forelimbs are developed as wings, making them the only mammals capable of flight. Bat species account for about 20% of all mammals.
Family: Vespertilionidae
Subfamily: Myotinae
Genus: Myotis
Bechstein's bat, M. bechsteini 
Lesser mouse-eared bat, M. blythii 
Brandt's bat, M. brandti 
Long-fingered bat, M. capaccinii 
Daubenton's bat, M. daubentonii  
Geoffroy's bat, M. emarginatus 
Greater mouse-eared bat, M. myotis 
Natterer's bat, M. nattereri 
Subfamily: Vespertilioninae
Genus: Barbastella
Western barbastelle, B. barbastellus 
Genus: Eptesicus
 Northern bat, Eptesicus nilssoni LC
 Serotine bat, Eptesicus serotinus LC
Genus: Nyctalus
Greater noctule bat, N. lasiopterus 
Lesser noctule, N. leisleri 
Common noctule, N. noctula 
Genus: Pipistrellus
Nathusius' pipistrelle, P. nathusii 
Common pipistrelle, P. pipistrellus LC
Genus: Plecotus
Brown long-eared bat, P. auritus 
 Grey long-eared bat, P. austriacus LC
Subfamily: Miniopterinae
Genus: Miniopterus
Common bent-wing bat, M. schreibersii 
Family: Rhinolophidae
Subfamily: Rhinolophinae
Genus: Rhinolophus
Blasius's horseshoe bat, R. blasii 
Mediterranean horseshoe bat, R. euryale 
Greater horseshoe bat, R. ferrumequinum 
Lesser horseshoe bat, R. hipposideros 
Mehely's horseshoe bat, R. mehelyi

Order: Cetacea (whales)

The order Cetacea includes whales, dolphins and porpoises. They are the mammals most fully adapted to aquatic life with a spindle-shaped nearly hairless body, protected by a thick layer of blubber, and forelimbs and tail modified to provide propulsion underwater.
Suborder: Odontoceti
Superfamily: Platanistoidea
Family: Phocoenidae
Genus: Phocoena
 Harbour porpoise, Phocoena phocoena VU
Family: Delphinidae (marine dolphins)
Genus: Tursiops
 Bottlenose dolphin, Tursiops truncatus DD
Genus: Delphinus
 Short-beaked common dolphin, Delphinus delphis

Order: Carnivora (carnivorans)

There are over 260 species of carnivorans, the majority of which feed primarily on meat. They have a characteristic skull shape and dentition. 
Suborder: Feliformia
Family: Felidae (cats)
Subfamily: Felinae
Genus: Felis
 European wildcat, F. silvestris 
Genus: Lynx
 Eurasian lynx, L. lynx 
Suborder: Caniformia
Family: Canidae (dogs, foxes)
Genus: Canis
 Golden jackal, C. aureus 
 European jackal, C. a. moreoticus
 Gray wolf, C. lupus 
 Eurasian wolf, C. l. lupus
Genus: Nyctereutes
Raccoon dog, N. procyonoides  introduced 
Genus: Vulpes
Red fox, V. vulpes 
Family: Ursidae (bears)
Genus: Ursus
Brown bear, U. arctos 
Eurasian brown bear, U. a. arctos
Family: Mustelidae (mustelids)
Genus: Lutra
 European otter, L. lutra 
Genus: Martes
Beech marten, M. foina 
European pine marten, M. martes 
Genus: Meles
 European badger, M. meles 
Genus: Mustela
Stoat, M. erminea 
Steppe polecat, M. eversmannii 
European mink, M. lutreola 
Least weasel, M. nivalis 
European polecat, M. putorius 
Genus: Neogale
American mink, N. vison  introduced
Genus: Vormela
Marbled polecat, V. peregusna

Order: Artiodactyla (even-toed ungulates)

The even-toed ungulates are ungulates whose weight is borne about equally by the third and fourth toes, rather than mostly or entirely by the third as in perissodactyls. There are about 220 artiodactyl species, including many that are of great economic importance to humans.
Family: Bovidae (cattle, antelope, sheep, goats)
Subfamily: Bovinae
Genus: Bison
European bison, B. bonasus  reintroduced
Carpathian wisent, B. b. hungarorum 
Subfamily: Caprinae
Genus: Rupicapra
Chamois, R. rupicapra 
Family: Cervidae (deer)
Subfamily: Cervinae
Genus: Cervus
Red deer, C. elaphus 
Genus: Dama
European fallow deer, D. dama  introduced
Subfamily: Capreolinae
Genus: Alces
Moose, A. alces 
Genus: Capreolus
Roe deer, C. capreolus 
Family: Suidae (pigs)
Subfamily: Suinae
Genus: Sus
Wild boar, S. scrofa

Locally extinct 
The following species are locally extinct in the country:
Mediterranean monk seal, Monachus monachus

See also
List of chordate orders
Lists of mammals by region
List of prehistoric mammals
Mammal classification
List of mammals described in the 2000s

References

External links

M
M
Romania
Romania